Kristy Turner is a British chemist, lecturer in the Department of Chemistry at the University of Manchester and a chemistry teacher at Bolton School, Manchester. Her research is based on the field of chemical education, science communication, development of the chemistry curriculum and assessment, and also in engagement of STEM subjects within school students. She is the current chair of the Education in Chemistry magazine editorial board at the Royal Society of Chemistry.

Education 
Kristy read her Doctor of Philosophy degree with Prof. David J. Procter on Solid-phase approaches to heterocycles using a sulfur linker cleaved by reduction with samarium (II) iodide at University of Glasgow and successfully gained her PhD in 2006.

Research and career 

Upon completion of her PhD, she joined the Royal Society of Chemistry trainee teacher program (Chemistry for Our Future initiative) in 2006, and since then has been a RSC school teacher fellow. She worked as a chemistry teacher at Westhoughton High School from 2006 to 2011, where she also was the Head of Chemistry from 2008 to 2011. She then moved to Bolton School in 2012, where she currently works as a chemistry teacher to date. In 2011, she also joined the University of Manchester as a RSC School teacher fellow. In 2012, she was promoted to Honorary fellow and is currently working as a school teacher fellow in chemical education and transition from the year 2015 on wards.

Turner is the current chair of the Education in Chemistry magazine editorial board at the Royal Society of Chemistry. She is also a member of the committee board at RSC in Curriculum and Assessment development for age groups 11 – 16 and 11 – 19.

Notable work 

Turner is the author of one of the popular RSC resource, Starters for ten. She also have published a variety of articles in both Chemistry World and Education in Chemistry including in chemistry assessment, organic chemistry, and relationships within a research group.

Turner has also appeared in a variety of television shows. The table below summarizes her work in the television media;

Awards and nominations 
 School Education Award (2017)

References

Living people
British chemists
Academics of the University of Manchester
21st-century chemists
Alumni of the University of Glasgow
Place of birth missing (living people)
Date of birth missing (living people)
British women scientists
Year of birth missing (living people)